General elections will be held in Uruguay on 27 October 2024. If no presidential candidate receives a majority in the first round of voting, a runoff will take place on Sunday 24 November 2024.

Background
Incumbent President Luis Lacalle Pou, who won the 2019 elections, cannot run again as the Constitution bars a president from immediate reelection. As a result, the governing National Party has to nominate a new candidate.

Electoral system
The President of Uruguay is elected using the two-round system, with a run-off held if no candidate receives 50% of the vote in the first round. The 30 members of the Senate are elected by proportional representation in a single nationwide constituency. The vice president, elected on the same ballot as the president, becomes president of the Senate, with his vote being determinant in case of tie. The 99 members of the Chamber of Representatives are elected by proportional representation in 19 multi-member constituencies based on the 19 departments. Seats are allocated using the highest averages method.

The elections are held using the double simultaneous vote method, whereby voters cast a single vote for the party of their choice for all three seats of Presidency, Senate and Chamber of Representatives.

Candidates
Presidential primaries will be held in April or June to select the candidates. So far, the politicians with highest stakes of taking part in this process are as follows:
 National Party
 Vice President Beatriz Argimón
 Secretary of the Presidency Álvaro Delgado
 Minister of Social Development Martín Lema
 Senator Jorge Gandini
 Senator Juan Sartori
 economist Laura Raffo

 Broad Front
 Intendant of Montevideo Carolina Cosse
 Intendant of Canelones Yamandú Orsi
 Intendant of Salto Andrés Lima
 Party President Fernando Pereira
 Senator Mario Bergara
 Senator Oscar Andrade

 Colorado Party
 Minister of Environment Adrián Peña
 Chief education officer Robert Silva
 lawyer Andrés Ojeda
 Senator Carmen Sanguinetti
 Representative Ope Pasquet
 former Senator Pedro Bordaberry
 OAS Secretary General Luis Almagro
 Representative Gustavo Zubía
 former Representative Julio Luis Sanguinetti

Opinion polls

Notes

Notes

References

Uruguay
General election
Elections in Uruguay
Uruguay